Archibald Burns may refer to:
Archibald Burns (photographer) (1831–1880), Scottish photographer
Archibald Burns (politician) (1867–1950), member of the New Zealand Legislative Council

See also
Archibaldo Burns (1914–2011), Mexican writer and film director